Meiogyne stenopetala is a species of plant in the custard apple family Annonaceae. Often found as a small tree or shrub in lowland sub tropical rainforest in Australia.

References

stenopetala
Flora of New South Wales
Flora of Queensland